Anilios insperatus, also known as the Fassifern blind snake, is a species of blind snake that is endemic to Australia. The specific epithet insperatus (“unexpected”) refers to the unexpected discovery of a new species in a well-populated and well-surveyed region less than 100 km from Brisbane. The common name derives from the type locality.

Description
The single known specimen is 9.7 cm in length. The small, slim body is uniformly pale.

Behaviour
The species is oviparous.

Distribution
The snake was discovered in the Scenic Rim Region of South East Queensland. The type locality is Warrill View in the Fassifern Valley.

References

 
insperatus
Snakes of Australia
Reptiles of Queensland
Reptiles described in 2015